Felix Lohkemper (born 26 January 1995) is a German professional footballer who plays as a forward for 1. FC Nürnberg.

References

External links
 

Living people
1995 births
Association football forwards
German footballers
VfB Stuttgart II players
TSG 1899 Hoffenheim II players
1. FSV Mainz 05 II players
1. FC Magdeburg players
1. FC Nürnberg players
3. Liga players
Germany youth international footballers
2. Bundesliga players
People from Wetzlar
Sportspeople from Giessen (region)
Footballers from Hesse